Madison County Airport  is a public airport located three miles (5 km) north of the central business district of London, a city in Madison County, Ohio, United States. It is owned by the Madison County Airport Authority.

Although most U.S. airports use the same three-letter location identifier for the FAA and IATA, Madison County Airport is assigned UYF by the FAA but has no designation from the IATA.

Facilities and aircraft 
For the 12-month period ending April 20, 2007, the airport had 41,410 aircraft operations, an average of 113 per day: 95% general aviation, 5% military and <1% air taxi.

References

External links 

Airports in Ohio